The following is a list of managers of Leeds United Association Football Club and their major honours, from the beginning of the club's official managerial records in 1919 to the present day. Each manager's entry includes the dates of his tenure and the club's overall competitive record (in terms of matches won, drawn and lost) and honours won while under his care.

Statistics
The statistics include all competitive first team fixtures in the domestic league and cup, and European competitions.
Information correct as of 21 February 2023.

Key
 = Caretaker managerP = Matches played; W = Matches won; D = Matches drawn; L = Matches lost; F = Goals for; A = Goals against

Managers with honours

References

External links
Soccerbase – Managerial history
Leeds-Fans.org.uk – Managerial statistics
MightyLeeds.co.uk – Managers

Managers
 
Leeds United AFC